The Tirgar people are found in the states of Gujarat and Rajasthan in India.

History 

The Tirgar derive their name from the words for arrow (tir) and maker (gar). This community was traditionally associated with the manufacture of bows and arrows. Their origin legend describes them as originally Rajput. They are said to have supplied arrows to the god Rama. The Tirgar claim to have immigrated to the region in the Middle Ages, and were invited by the local Rajput community to manufacture bows and arrows. Tirgar from Rajasthan used to make them for Maharana Pratap, Shivaji Maharaj.

Residence

The Tirgar inhabit the districts of Jalore, Mevad, Jaipur, Udaipur, Dungarpur, Barmer and Sirohi. They speak Marwari and profess Hinduism. Their main deities are Thakurji and Shundamata. Like other Hindu castes, they are divided into (20) gotras. Their main clans are Chauhan, Darbar,        Parmar and Rajput, and Rathore In the northern part of India and Pakistan, Rathore is a clan of Rajputs who claim descent from the mythical Suryavansha (solar dynasty). Some of the other groups who claim to be of Rathore origin are Marathas, and Kolis. Alternative spellings include Rathaur or Rathor or Rathur or Rathod or Rathour or Rahtore. They  maintain the principle of gotra exogamy.

With the demise of their traditional occupation, the community mainly engage in agriculture. They are mainly landless, and depend on wage labour.

In Gujarat, the Tirgar are found mainly in the districts of Banaskatha, Palanpur, Vadgam, Ambaji, Ahmedabad, Panchamahal, Sabarkantha and Kheda. They divided into clans, which are arranged hierarchically order, starting with the Parmar, followed by the Rajput, Darbar, Chauhan, Rathore,  and Waghela The Tirgar practice hypergamy and hypogamy.  They are community of small farmers, with many immigrating to the various urban centres of Gujarat. Their customs are similar to other Hindu communities of north Gujarat.

The Gujarati Tirgar belong to the Bijpanthi sect of Hinduism, and pay particular reverence to Krishna.

References

Dalit communities
Social groups of Rajasthan
Social groups of Gujarat
Tribal communities of Gujarat